Om Singh Rathore (also called Shri Om Banna and Bullet Baba) is a shrine located in Pali district near Jodhpur, India, devoted to a deity. called Om Banna. The motorcycle is a 350cc Royal Enfield Bullet RNJ 7773.

Hundreds of devotees turn up every day to pray for a safe journey.

History 
On 5 May 1988, Om Banna (formerly known as Om Singh Rathore;  banna, an honorary word used for Rajput youth) was travelling from the town of Bangdi near Sanderao of Pali, to Chotila, when he lost control of his motorcycle and hit a tree. He died on the spot whereas the motorcycle fell into a nearby ditch. The morning after the accident, local police took the motorcycle to a nearby police station. The next day it was reported to have mysteriously disappeared from the station and was found back at the site of the incident. Police, once again, took the motorcycle, this time emptying its fuel tank and putting it under lock and key. Despite their efforts, the next morning it again disappeared and was found at the accident site. Legend says that the motorcycle kept returning to the same ditch. It thwarted every attempt by police to keep it at the local police station; the motorcycle always returned to the same spot before dawn.

This came to be seen as a miracle by local population, and they began to worship the "Bullet Bike." News of the miracle motorcycle spread to nearby villages, and later they built a temple to worship it. This temple is known as "Bullet Baba's Temple." It is believed that Om Banna's spirit helps distressed travellers.

Worship 
Every day nearby villagers and travelers stop and pray to the bike and its late owner Om Singh Rathore. Those who pass by stop to bow their heads leave offerings in honour of the helpful spirit, and some drivers also offer small bottles of alcohol at the site. It is said that a person who does not stop to pray at the shrine is in for a dangerous journey. Devotees also apply the 'tilak' mark and tie a red thread on the motorbike. Local people sing folk songs in the name of Om Banna.

Offerings include Incense sticks, flowers, coconut, liquor, red thread and sweets. An eternal flame is kept at the shrine.

References 

https://timesofindia.indiatimes.com/travel/things-to-do/interesting-temples-in-india-and-their-unsolved-mysteries/slideshow_list/70043847.cms

External links 
Listen and Download Om Banna Bhajans and Songs
Om Banna, Chotila
Listen to AUDIO "Om Banna Ri Katha" at Saavn.com

Regional Hindu gods
Hindu folk deities
People from Pali district